DYUP (102.7 FM) is a radio station owned and operated by the University of the Philippines Visayas under the Division of Humanities. The station's studio and transmitter are located at the College of Arts and Sciences, UPV Campus, Miagao.

References

College radio stations in the Philippines
Radio stations in Iloilo
University of the Philippines Visayas